The 14th National Assembly of Pakistan was the legislature of Pakistan following the 2013 general election of members of parliament (MPs) to the National Assembly of Pakistan, the lower house of the bicameral Majlis-e-Shura. The National Assembly is a democratically elected body consisting of 342 members, who are referred to as Members of the National Assembly (MNAs), of which 272 are directly elected members; 70 reserved seats for women and religious minorities are allocated to the political parties according to their proportion of the total vote.

The election saw each of Parliament's 272 geographical constituencies return one MP to the National Assembly. It resulted in a Pakistan Muslim League (N) (PML-N) majority, and a massive loss of seats for the Pakistan Peoples Party (PPP). The PML-N became the single largest party, though without an overall majority. The PML-N won 163 seats in the National Assembly. This resulted in a hung parliament. A coalition agreement was formed following negotiations with independent candidates who joined the PML-N, allowing the party to form a simple majority government by bringing on-board nineteen independent candidates, thirteen more than the minimum required to form a government. This swing resulted in Nawaz Sharif becoming the new Prime Minister of Pakistan for the third time. Syed Khurshid Ahmed Shah won a PPP leadership vote to succeed Nisar Ali Khan as permanent Leader of the Opposition. Ayaz Sadiq and Murtaza Javed Abbasi of PML-N were elected as the legislature’s speaker and deputy speaker, respectively.

Members of the 14th National Assembly took an oath on 1 June 2013, and marked the constitutional transition of power from one democratically elected government to another for the first time in the history of Pakistan.

In July 2017, the Supreme Court of Pakistan disqualified Prime Minister Nawaz Sharif from holding membership in the National Assembly following an investigation on corruption allegations regarding his family's wealth, forcing him to resign as Prime Minister. Shahid Khaqan Abbasi was elected by the National Assembly as the new Prime Minister on 1 August 2017. The 14th National Assembly was dissolved on 31 May 2018 after completing its five-year constitutional term.

Members

Membership changes

See also 

 List of members of the 1st National Assembly of Pakistan
 List of members of the 2nd National Assembly of Pakistan
 List of members of the 3rd National Assembly of Pakistan
 List of members of the 4th National Assembly of Pakistan
 List of members of the 5th National Assembly of Pakistan
 List of members of the 6th National Assembly of Pakistan
 List of members of the 7th National Assembly of Pakistan
 List of members of the 8th National Assembly of Pakistan
 List of members of the 9th National Assembly of Pakistan
 List of members of the 10th National Assembly of Pakistan
 List of members of the 11th National Assembly of Pakistan
 List of members of the 12th National Assembly of Pakistan
 List of members of the 13th National Assembly of Pakistan
 List of members of the 14th National Assembly of Pakistan
 List of members of the 15th National Assembly of Pakistan

Notes

References

2013 Pakistani general election
Lists of members of the National Assembly of Pakistan by term
Pakistani MNAs 2013–2018